Olawunmi Okerayi, known by her stage name DJ Lambo, is a Nigerian disc jockey. Her song "Drank" was produced by Reinhard and received positive critical reviews and extensive airplay. She was signed to Loopy Music in 2013 before its merge with Chocolate City in 2015. She won DJ of the Year (Female) at the 2016 City People Entertainment Awards.
Nigerian Entertainment Today (NET) listed her as one of top five Nigerian DJs to watch out for in 2015.

In 2017, DJ Lambo was among the few DJs selected to play at Big Brother Nigeria's season 2 Saturday party of the Big Brother Naija reality game show.

Early life and music career

Early life
DJ Lambo grew up with four brothers in Nigeria. Her father, DJ Tony Lewis influenced her career as a disc jockey. She started her professional career in 2008–2009 as a Radio personality|(OAP) on Raypower 100.5 FM, Rhythm FM 94.7 Abuja, and Love 104.5 FM Abuja.

Artistry
DJ Lambo describes her sound as a fusion of house music, techno, afropop and hip hop. Her song "Drank"  was produced by Reinhard and received positive critical reviews and extensive airplay. She was signed to Loopy Music in 2013 before its merge with Chocolate City in 2015.

Smirnoff Equalizing Music
On March 8, 2017, Smirnoff launched the Equalizing Music initiative on behalf of the International Women's Day to celebrate female DJs around the world. DJ Lambo was ranked number 18 on the Smirnoff Top Women Electronic Artists playlist with her single "Motion".

On March 20, 2017, Smirnoff Nigeria also celebrated International Women's Day at Crest Hotels and Garden Jos with the top three finalists of the Smirnoff X1 Female DJ contestants alongside DJ Lambo and DJ Spinall at the event.

Choc Boi Nation President
On 14 June 2017, she was named the head and president of Choc Boi Nation (CBN), a record imprint of Chocolate City Music. With this announcement she became one of the major female record label executives in the music industry in Nigeria. The press conference,  held in Lagos, was attended by co-label mates MI Abaga, Dice Ailes, Koker and Loose Kaynon

Educational background
DJ Lambo has a degree in English and Literature from the University of Abuja
She is also an alma mater of Methodist Girls High School.

Notable performances
She has performed at several popular events and shows since her rise to stardom, including:

Discography

Singles

As featured artist

Compilation singles

Compilation albums

Mixtape album

Awards and nominations

References

External links
 DJ Lambo

Living people
21st-century Nigerian musicians
Musicians from Lagos State
Nigerian hip hop DJs
Nigerian radio presenters
Nigerian women radio presenters
Year of birth missing (living people)